Brenda M. Greene, is an American scholar, author, literary activist, and radio host at Medgar Evers College of the City University of New York. Greene is also the founder and executive director of the Center for Black Literature, the director of the National Black Writers Conference, and the former chair of the English department at Medgar Evers College. Prior to her work in the academy, Greene also worked as an educator in the New York City Public School system, and with civic and political organizations, to enrich and engage the community-at-large. Since 2004, she has served as a radio host on WNYE radio, connecting listeners to some of today's most accomplished writers. She is the former board chair of the Nkiru Center for Education and Culture, co-founded by hip hop icons Yasiin Bey and Talib Kweli.

Early life and education 
Brenda M. Greene was born October 29, 1950, in Fort Monmouth, New Jersey. She attended public schools in Queens and Brooklyn and graduated from Erasmus Hall High School in Brooklyn, New York. She obtained a Bachelor of Science in English education at New York University, a Master of Arts at Hunter College of the City University of New York and a PhD in composition and rhetoric at New York University.

Academic career 
Greene  served as director of the Right to Read Program at Malcolm King College Harlem Extension before coming to Medgar Evers College in 1980.  During her tenure at Medgar Evers, she has taught an array of courses in composition, literature and African American literature, served on curriculum, program, assessment and accreditation committees, and held many administrative positions within Medgar Evers College and within the City University of New York. 
She has spent a lifetime working in and building cultural arts institutions that are dedicated to progressing Black life in Brooklyn and beyond. Powered by this mission, Greene has forged long-standing friendships and collaborations with many supportive individuals, including Sonia Sanchez, Susan Taylor, Danny Glover, Michael Eric Dyson, Marita Golden, Edwidge Danticat, Khalil Gibran Muhammad, Tracy K. Smith, Colson Whitehead, a host of elected officials throughout New York, and many others. Similarly, her strategic partnerships with institutions such as the Schomburg Center for Research in Black Culture, Bedford Stuyvesant Restoration Corporation, Amazon Literary Partnership, New-York Historical Society, African Voices, the Brooklyn Literary Council, the College of Education at Sacramento State, and others, have resulted in progressive programs and initiatives throughout the decades.

As a professional in English studies, Greene has been an active member and served in leadership positions at the National Council of Teachers of English (NCTE).  She has also led literary and writing seminars for the council and she has been a jurist for professional and literary organizations.

Radio
Greene hosts a weekly radio program, Writers on Writing, which features writers from the African diaspora discussing their novels, poems, plays, nonfiction and their lives over the airwaves of WNYE, 91.5 FM. Since 2004, she has interviewed the full spectrum of Black writers—from debut novelists and indie writers to high-profile New York Times Best-Selling Authors. Her guests have included Elizabeth Alexander, Tracy K. Smith, Walter Mosley, David Dinkins, Ta-Nehisi Coates, Edwidge Danticat, Michael Eric Dyson, Cornel West, Haki R. Madhubuti, Amiri Baraka, Ishmael Reed, and Tananarive Due among others.

Writing 
The African Presence and Influence on the Cultures of the Americas. (2010)
Resistance and Transformation: Conversations with Black Writers. (2010)
Meditations and Ascensions: Black Writers on Writing. (2008).
Defining Ourselves: Black Writers in the 90s. (1999).
Rethinking American Literature. (1997).

Personal life
Greene is the mother of Talib Kweli Greene, a hip hop artist; and Jamal Greene, Dwight Professor of Law at Columbia Law School. She has five grandchildren.

Honors and awards

 Zora Neale Hurston Literary Award, Brooklyn United Scholarship Association, 2019.
 Lifetime Achievement Award, Brooklyn Oldtimers Foundation, December 2017
 Medgar Evers College Percy E. Sutton SEEK Women's Empowerment Award, March 2016.
 Medgar Evers College Community Council Educational Leadership Award, April 2015.
 Lynnette Velasco Community Impact award from the Harlem Arts Festival, 2015.
 Determined to Educate Leadership Award, 2014.
 Harriet Jacobs Award for Excellence in Literature, Greater Queens LINKS-Arts Facet, 2013.
 Arts and Culture Award, First Annual City College Celebration of Women in Arts and Culture, 2012.
 Spirit of Africa Award for Achievements in the Creative Arts and in Connecting the World to the Works of Emerging and Established Writers of Color, 2010.
 Gwendolyn Brooks Conference International Literary Hall of Fame for Writers of African Descent Inductee, 2010.
 Phenomenal Women in the Media Award, Von King Cultural Park, March 2010
 Betty Smith Arts Award, Brooklyn Borough President's Office, March 2010.
 National Conference of Artists Award for Excellence in the Promotion of Black Literature, 2009.

References

External links 
 https://www.centerforblackliterature.org
 https://www.youtube.com/c/CenterforBlackLiteratureMedgarEversCollege

African-American radio personalities
American writers
People from Brooklyn
1950 births
Living people
21st-century African-American people
20th-century African-American people